Yekaterinovka is a rural locality (a village) in Yanurusovsky Selsoviet, Ishimbaysky District, Bashkortostan, Russia. The population was 21 as of 2010. There is 1 street.

Geography 
Yekaterinovka is located 46 km northeast of Ishimbay (the district's administrative centre) by road. Mikhaylovka is the nearest rural locality.

References 

Rural localities in Ishimbaysky District